Michael Albrecht (born 25 November 1947) is a German politician of the Christian Democratic Union (CDU) and former member of the German Bundestag.

Life 
Albrecht successfully completed his studies from 1966 to 1970 to become a certified teacher of music and German at the University of Halle. In 1978 he joined the CDU in the GDR and became a member of the Volkskammer in March 1990. From 3 October 1990, the day of German reunification, until 20 December 1990, the day of the first session of the 12th German Bundestag, he was a member of the German Bundestag elected by the Volkskammer, where he was a member of the CDU/CSU parliamentary group.

Literature

References

1947 births
Members of the Bundestag for Saxony
Members of the Bundestag 1987–1990
Members of the Bundestag for the Christian Democratic Union of Germany
Living people